Uhersko a municipality and village in Pardubice District in the Pardubice Region of the Czech Republic. It has about 300 inhabitants.

History
The first written mention of Uhersko is from 1308.

Sights
The landmark of Uhersko is the Church of the Assumption of the Virgin Mary. It was built in the Baroque style in 1704.

References

Villages in Pardubice District